Pickard is a surname, an Anglicised version of Picard, originally meaning a person from Picardy, a historical region and cultural area of France.

Notable people with the surname include:

Al Pickard (1895–1975), Canadian ice hockey administrator and president of the Canadian Amateur Hockey Association
Bob Pickard (born 1952), American football player
Calvin Pickard (born 1992), Canadian ice hockey player
Charles Pickard (1915–1944), Royal Air Force officer
Chet Pickard (born 1989), American hockey player
Cyril Stanley Pickard (1917–1992), British diplomat
Greenleaf Whittier Pickard (1877–1956), American radio pioneer
Hannah Maynard Pickard (1812–1844), American school teacher, preceptress, author
James Pickard, English inventor
Jan Pickard (1927–1998), South African rugby player
Jerry Pickard (1940–2021), Canadian politician
John Pickard (American actor) (1913–1993), American actor
John Pickard (composer) (born 1963), British composer
John Pickard (British actor) (born 1977), British actor
John Pickard (politician) (1824–1883), Canadian politician
Judy Pickard (1921–2016), New Zealand abstract painter, librarian and advocate for women's rights
Louise Pickard (1865–1928), British artist
Lord Ronin Pickard (Born 2001), Scottish Lord
Neil Pickard (1929–2007), Australian politician
Group Captain Percy Charles Pickard (1915–1944), Royal Air Force officer
Flight Lieutenant Stanley Gilbert Pickard (active 1940s), Royal Air Force officer
Thomas J. Pickard (born 1950), director of the Federal Bureau of Investigation
Tom Pickard (born 1946), British poet
Tony Pickard (born 1934), English tennis coach
William Leonard Pickard (born 1945), American convicted for manufacturing LSD

See also
Pickard, Indiana, a small town in the United States
Pickard-Cambridge, a surname
Thornton-Pickard, a former British manufacturer of photographic cameras
Pickard China, American china company
Picard (disambiguation)
Piccard
Piccardo

References

English-language surnames
Ethnonymic surnames